Ernest Hüttenmoser was a Swiss water polo player. He competed in the men's tournament at the 1928 Summer Olympics.

References

External links
  

Year of birth missing
Possibly living people
Swiss male water polo players
Olympic water polo players of Switzerland
Water polo players at the 1928 Summer Olympics
Place of birth missing